Ernesto Antonio Farías (born 29 May 1980) is an Argentine former professional footballer who played as a striker.

Club career
Born in Trenque Lauquen, Buenos Aires Province, Farías started playing professionally in 1997 for Estudiantes de La Plata, making his Primera División debut in a 2–2 draw against Club Atlético Lanús, 19 days shy of his 18th birthday. From his third season onwards he never scored less than 14 league goals, including 12 in the 2003 Apertura alone, a competition-best, as his team ranked in midtable.

Farías left Estudiantes as their fifth-ever goal scorer, netting nearly one goal every two games. He signed with Italian club U.S. Città di Palermo for the 2004–05 campaign, teaming up with compatriot Mariano González and appearing in only 13 Serie A matches, going scoreless in the process.

Subsequently, Farías returned to his country and joined Club Atlético River Plate, being crowned top scorer in the 2006 edition of the Copa Libertadores at five (tied with 13 other players) as the Buenos Aires side reached the quarter-finals. In late July 2007, after a failed transfer to Deportivo Toluca F.C. for personal reasons, he signed a four-year contract for FC Porto in a €4 million deal.

During his three-year spell in Portugal, Farías was mostly used as a substitute, consecutively barred by Lisandro López, Hulk and Radamel Falcao. He still managed to contribute solidly to the conquest of five major titles by scoring 34 official goals, 23 of those coming in the Primeira Liga.

In January 2010, Farías had everything arranged with Cruzeiro Esporte Clube as part of the deal involving Kléber, but the move eventually collapsed. In late July he finally joined the Brazilians, agreeing on a three-year contract; he scored his first goal for the club on 5 September, in a 3–2 away win over Sociedade Esportiva Palmeiras.

In late January 2012, Farías returned to his country and signed with Club Atlético Independiente, on loan.

International career
On 3 September 2005, Farías won his first – and only – cap for the Argentina national team, in a 0–1 away loss against Paraguay for the 2006 FIFA World Cup qualifiers. Previously, in 1999, he appeared for the under-20s in the World Cup held in Nigeria, playing in three games in an eventual round-of-16 exit.

Personal life
Farías was nicknamed El Tecla ("The key"), because in his early adolescence years his uneven teeth were likened to a piano.

Honours

Club
Porto
Primeira Liga: 2007–08, 2008–09
Taça de Portugal: 2008–09, 2009–10
Supertaça Cândido de Oliveira: 2009

Cruzeiro
Campeonato Mineiro: 2011

América
Categoría Primera B: 2016

International
Argentina
South American Youth Championship: 1999

Individual
Argentine Primera División top scorer: Apertura 2003
Copa Libertadores top scorer: 2006

References

External links
 Argentine League statistics at Fútbol XXI
 
 
 

1980 births
Living people
Sportspeople from Buenos Aires Province
Argentine footballers
Association football forwards
Argentine Primera División players
Estudiantes de La Plata footballers
Club Atlético River Plate footballers
Club Atlético Independiente footballers
Serie A players
Palermo F.C. players
Primeira Liga players
FC Porto players
Campeonato Brasileiro Série A players
Cruzeiro Esporte Clube players
Uruguayan Primera División players
Danubio F.C. players
Categoría Primera A players
Categoría Primera B players
América de Cali footballers
Argentina under-20 international footballers
Argentina international footballers
Argentine expatriate footballers
Expatriate footballers in Italy
Expatriate footballers in Portugal
Expatriate footballers in Brazil
Expatriate footballers in Uruguay
Expatriate footballers in Colombia
Argentine expatriate sportspeople in Italy
Argentine expatriate sportspeople in Portugal
Argentine expatriate sportspeople in Brazil
Argentine expatriate sportspeople in Uruguay
Argentine expatriate sportspeople in Colombia